Espalion is a commune in the Aveyron department in southern France.

Population

Sights
Château de Calmont d'Olt
The Pont-Vieux (Old Bridge) is part of the World Heritage Sites of the Routes of Santiago de Compostela in France.
Church of Perse, in Romanesque style, with some Gothic chapels added in 1471. 
Church of St. John the Baptist, built from 1472

International relations
Espalion is twinned with:
 Tauste, Spain

See also
List of medieval bridges in France
Communes of the Aveyron department

References

Communes of Aveyron
Rouergue
World Heritage Sites in France
Aveyron communes articles needing translation from French Wikipedia